The 1990 Hamilton Tiger-Cats season was the 33rd season for the team in the Canadian Football League and their 41st overall. The Tiger-Cats finished in 4th place in the East Division with a 6–12 record and failed to make the playoffs for the first time since 1977.

Offseason

CFL Draft

Preseason

Regular season

Season standings

Season schedule

Awards and honours

1990 CFL All-Stars

References

Hamilton Tiger-Cats seasons
Ham
Hamilton Tiger-Cats